The  Alameda-Contra Costa Transit District (AC Transit) bus fleet, serving the counties of Alameda and Contra Costa, is the third-largest in California. The first new buses were purchased for AC Transit in 1960, shortly after its formation and the GM New Look buses were delivered later that year. The transit agency operated GM buses exclusively until 1974, when the first Flxible New Look buses were ordered. Since then, AC Transit has ordered and operated buses from most of the major North American transit bus manufacturers, including Flyer, Gillig, Motor Coach Industries, Neoplan USA, and North American Bus Industries, as well as Van Hool, a Belgian bus supplier.

AC Transit has four operating divisions where buses are stored and light maintenance is performed, one central maintenance facility for major overhauls, and a general office in downtown Oakland, California.

Summary
AC Transit is the third-largest bus-only transit agency in California, carrying an average of 200,000 riders per weekday on 149 service lines, with  miles of annual revenue service traveled by its fleet of buses.

Active

Notes

Future Fleet

Retired

Notes

Experimental and prototype

Notes

History

Key System inheritance
At its inception in 1960, AC Transit purchased the mixed White, Mack, and GM "old-look" bus fleet from its predecessor, the Key System. Later in 1961, AC Transit began converting 10 of the GM old-look gasoline-powered buses to diesel using secondhand transmissions and engines. The last of 26 Mack buses remaining in the fleet, #2510, ran a "farewell tour" on Line 43 in February 1965, decorated with painted tears and the message "To my friends, good-bye."

New Look "Transit Liners"

The first new buses ordered for AC Transit were 250 diesel GM New Look buses, which were delivered by late 1961. AC Transit began New Look "Transit Liner" operation in late 1960. The New Looks were credited with turning around ridership and revenue for the District. Many were equipped with air conditioning, and these proved especially popular in that first summer of operation, when high temperatures reached .

AC Transit would continue to operate a mixed fleet of buses throughout the 1960s; the buses purchased from Key System started to be retired in 1969 (#1806 was the first diesel Old Look retired), but were not fully retired until 1974 with the delivery of Flxible buses. In 1969, the fleet consisted of 693 diesel-powered GM buses: 462 New Looks and 131 Old Looks. AC Transit continued purchasing exclusively GM New Look buses through the early 1970s. In 1970, AC Transit announced that it would test GM's Environment Improvement Package (EIP), an emissions control retrofit consisting of a needle injector valve, catalytic muffler, air induction system, and rubber engine mountings; the District also noted it would participate in a steam-powered bus experiment, and was willing to evaluate electric- and turbine-powered buses. The "low sac needle" injector was credited with reducing smoke by up to 93% and odors by a factor of 15. The first EIP-equipped bus was assigned fleet #902 and entered revenue service in early 1971. All the AC Transit New Look buses were fitted with the new injectors by November 1972. In 1972, with the opening of BART, the District equipped all New Look buses with a blue light next to headsigns. The blue light was illuminated with the words "TO BART" when the bus was headed towards a BART station.

In 1974, AC Transit ordered 120 Flxible New Look buses, its first purchase of new buses that had not gone to GM. In 1975, a second round of bids were solicited for 36 additional "deluxe" buses with reclining seats and air conditioning, intended for a BART contract to provide extension service to suburban areas. For the 1975 orders, inflation and additional equipment greatly increased the price. As it turned out, AC Transit would never receive another new bus from GM.

In August/September 1976, AC Transit was one of ten agencies to participate in a group purchase of AM General/MAN SG 220 articulated buses, part of the first widespread deployment of articulated buses in North America once the orders began to be delivered in 1978. After a fire in the Transbay Tube shut down BART service for several months starting on January 17, 1979, the AC Transit articulated buses were diverted to Transbay service.

"Advanced Design" and dropping GM

Models of three coaches designed by GM, American Motors, and Rohr Industries for the Transbus project were shown in 1973. Although none of the Transbus project prototypes would ever go into production, AC Transit expressed an interest in acquiring the GMC RTS-II in 1975; the RTS-II "Advanced Design" coach was a direct descendant of the GM Transbus prototype. In July 1976, AC Transit released requests for bids for the next generation of buses: 66 "Advanced Design" and several smaller coaches. In September and October 1976, Flxible 870 and GMC RTS-II buses toured several East Bay cities; these "Advanced Design" coaches were being evaluated as potential replacements for the existing New Look fleet. AC Transit ordered 66 RTS-II buses in May 1977 from GM as part of a larger group purchase with five other operators. The purchase was allowed to proceed after a lawsuit by the losing bidder, AM General, was settled; the judge concluded the buses could be purchased without wheelchair lifts because of their limited reliability. However, AC Transit canceled the contract in 1979, citing the high cost, which had risen to  each, slow delivery (delivery had been expected in 1978), and fewer seats than the existing New Look buses. The District rejected several RTS buses that had already been assembled; the completed buses were later sold to the Santa Clara County Transit District.

Rather than pursue a set of "Advanced Design" buses, AC Transit chose to purchase buses with New Look-derived designs after the RTS contract was canceled; AC Transit ordered 175 Flyer D901 buses in  lengths. The Flyer D901 fleet were the first AC Transit buses to be equipped with electronic route signs, along with kneeling suspension and a wheelchair lift. 15 more Flyer D901s were added in 1982.

By 1981, the District was once again soliciting bids for 60 "Advanced Design" buses; although the original "Transit Liner" New Looks delivered in 1960 were being replaced by the Flyer D901s, some of the Transit Liners still remained in service. In 1982, AC Transit ordered 141 buses from Gillig and 60 from Neoplan; the Gillig Phantom buses were updated New Look designs, while the Neoplan AN440 "Transliner" coaches were true "Advanced Design" buses. The first Gillig, a 40-ft Phantom, arrived on site for testing in June 1982, and AC Transit would place another order with Gillig for 134 additional coaches in 1983, at a cost of  each. With the Gilligs, AC Transit updated its livery from the "clownface" design first applied to the Transit Liners in 1960. The Neoplans were delivered in August and September 1982.

AC Transit ordered 56 New Flyer D35HF and D40HF coaches in 1988 at an average cost of  each to replace some of the oldest GM New Looks. The New Flyers were assembled in the local Union City plant. The District added 52 more 40-foot D40HF coaches and purchased 30 D60HF buses to add to the articulated fleet in 1989; the new D60HFs replaced 30 older articulated buses that had been temporarily leased from Santa Clara County Transit District. Additional orders of Gillig Phantoms followed in the early 1990s, and a second round of 30 New Flyer D60HFs delivered in 1996 allowed AC Transit to retire the original AM General/MAN articulated buses.

Starting in 1996, AC Transit added 204 Model 416 40-foot high-floor buses from North American Bus Industries (NABI). The 416 was originally introduced in 1989 by American Ikarus as a domestic variant of the  before the company was spun off in 1996 as NABI.

AC Transit rolled out its first low-floor buses in 2000, when it received 44 NABI 40-LFW (040.70) coaches; a subsequent procurement of 40 low-floor coaches was originally awarded to Orion Bus Industries. These factors tipped the award to NABI, and a second round of 40-LFW buses was procured instead.

Also in 2000, AC Transit began operating a fleet of 45-foot over-the-road (suburban) coaches purchased from Motor Coach Industries beginning in the early 2000s.

Van Hool
In 2003, AC Transit began purchasing low-floor buses from Van Hool. The Van Hool buses were assembled in Belgium and featured low floors and three doors (four doors on articulated models), which AC Transit touted as the key to bus rapid transit service between Berkeley and San Leandro along Shattuck, Telegraph, International Blvd, and East 14th Street.

After receiving criticism for the use of federal funds to purchase foreign-made Van Hool buses and tailored specification requirements to exclude domestic manufacturers, AC Transit ordered locally-built Gillig buses in 2012. In March 2013, AC Transit began operating the first of its new Gillig buses. In August of the same year, AC Transit placed the first of its new New Flyer Xcelsior articulated buses into service. Later that year, in November 2013, new Gillig buses with a suburban seating configuration and Transbay branding were introduced into service.

All AC Transit buses are wheelchair accessible and have front-mounted bicycle racks. The MCI buses also feature luggage bay bicycle racks. AC Transit buses purchased after 2007 have air conditioning, as approved by the board of directors.

Special types

Articulated buses
AC Transit pioneered the use of articulated buses in the United States; in March 1966 it was the first transit agency to use the Super Golden Eagle long-distance coach (one of five originally designed and built for Continental Trailways; AC Transit designated it XMC-77 and called it the "Freeway Train"), primarily on Transbay service.

By 1970, AC Transit was one of six agencies to participate in a "super bus project" coordinated by the National Transportation Center (Pittsburgh) to write a specification for a higher-capacity bus; once the specification had been written, two prototypes would be built and tested to select a winner for a large group procurement of 100 buses to keep per-unit costs low. Riders received the M.A.N. bus favorably, and the specification was released for bid in 1975; AC Transit placed an order for 30 MAN SG 220 buses in 1976 and deliveries began from the AM General/M.A.N. joint venture in 1978.

Steam power
In 1969, AC Transit received a grant and converted bus #666 to steam power, which ran in revenue service between 1971 and 1972. The propulsion system was designed by William Brobeck, who had previously worked on the Bevatron. #666 used a triple-expansion closed-loop reciprocating steam engine; power was improved compared to the original six-cylinder Detroit Diesel 6V71 engine and emissions were reduced, but fuel consumption was higher than a conventional diesel bus. Prior to entering service, the steam bus was exhibited in Washington DC and to the public. Bus #666 completed  in revenue service when the trial ended in September 1972, and the diesel engine was subsequently reinstalled on the bus.

Hydrogen fuel cell

The District began the HyRoad program in 1999 and tested several hydrogen fuel cell-powered buses, including the Ballard/XCELLSiS ZEbus (a New Flyer F40LF fitted with a Ballard fuel cell) in November 1999 for one week. The ZEbus would go on to be tested by the SunLine Transit Agency for a year in 2000. AC Transit also tested the ThunderPower bus in 2003 and 2004. ThunderPower was based on an ElDorado National EZ Rider 2 chassis, equipped with the Siemens ELFA series hybrid drive train.

The next phase of the HyRoad program was stymied when AC Transit attempted to procure a fuel cell bus in 2000: only one vendor provided a bid, but it was later withdrawn. The District eventually found a willing vendor in Van Hool, based on the A330 chassis, with fuel cell integration to be performed by ISE Corp. and UTC Power; the order comprised four buses: three for AC Transit and one for SunLine. The three "first-generation" fuel cell buses were delivered to AC Transit in October and December 2005 at a cost of  each, approximately ten times the cost of an equivalent diesel bus. Each fuel cell bus was each approximately  heavier than a diesel equivalent. They would be evaluated under the Federal Transit Administration's National Fuel Cell Bus Program, and were operated in revenue service from March 20, 2006, to 2010.

The chassis was purpose-designed to accommodate fuel cell and electric traction motor components.

The first AC Transit hydrogen station was installed at Richmond (Division 3) in 2002, producing hydrogen through the electrolysis of water. Another hydrogen fueling station was installed at East Oakland (Division 4) by Chevron on March 13, 2006, using a methane reformer, and it was planned to be decommissioned in September 2010 after a new station opened at Emeryville (Division 2).

One of the fuel cell buses (FC2) operated in revenue service for Golden Gate Transit for one month in 2008 and again briefly in 2009. The fleet of three buses achieved an aggregate availability of 61%, short of the 85% target; however, this was driven mainly by the main traction batteries, which accounted for 36% of all unavailable days. The period of evaluation varied by bus, as each bus required the cell stack assemblies to be replaced at various points in 2008.

AC Transit is the lead agency of Zero Emission Bay Area (ZEBA), a consortium of five Bay Area transit agencies (AC Transit, Golden Gate Transit, SFMTA, SamTrans, and VTA) demonstrating fuel cell buses. Under ZEBA, AC Transit took delivery of 12 additional "second-generation" fuel cell buses, based on the Van Hool A300L and numbered FC4 to FC15, in 2011. The fuel cell and propulsion systems were planned to be transferred from FC1–FC3 to the first three of the third-generation buses. A 13th fuel cell bus was acquired at a nominal cost, and the 14th fuel cell bus was the first 60-foot articulated New Flyer fuel cell bus built, originally ordered by Connecticut Transit.

A "third-generation" fleet of fuel cell and battery-electric buses based on the New Flyer Xcelsior (XE40 and XHE40, respectively) were delivered in 2019 for a direct comparison of the two zero-emissions technologies in revenue service. With the state's mandate to move to a completely zero-emissions fleet by 2040, the District will use the results of the comparison to determine the optimum mix of bus propulsion technologies.

Livery
By September 1960, AC Transit had selected the "wing" logo along with a color palette that included silver, "Tahoe turquoise", "Monterey cypress green", and "persimmon orange." The buses purchased from Key System were repainted from their original "fruit salad" colors to the "clownface" livery in 1960 and 1961, featuring a predominantly white (upper half) and orange (lower front) color scheme with green side stripes, matching the newly delivered New Looks. The exterior design won a national award from Fleet Owner magazine in October 1961. AC Transit retained the "clownface" livery for new orders through the Flyer D901s ordered in 1979.

The Gillig Phantoms and Neoplan AN440s ordered by AC Transit in 1982 were delivered with a more subtle "stripe" livery featuring the same three-color palette as the previous clownface livery. Some buses received a variant of the stripe livery, but the majority of new buses for the District bore the stripe livery, featuring orange and green horizontal stripes on predominantly white coaches. The wheels also lost their signature persimmon orange color with later orders. In the early 1990s, at least one bus (#1422) was painted as a test in a modified clownface livery featuring orange (bottom front) and green (top half) separated by a thin white stripe.

In 2003, AC Transit rolled out an updated "ribbon" livery and logo featuring new colors (primarily white with green and black accents). The suburban-type buses in Transbay service were painted in primarily green.

Logos

AC Transit adopted its first official "ring-and-arrow" emblem around September 1958, replacing an arrowhead logo that had been used on the masthead of its public newsletter Transit Times, first published in May 1958. The ring-and-arrow logo was replaced in 1960 when AC Transit adopted the familiar "wing" logo, which was "designed to imply a sense of motion and speed" although the colors were not finalized until September of that year. A simplified version of the wing logo was painted on buses and signs.

The wing logo was unchanged until 2003, when the District adopted a stylized green and gradient-gray "ribbon" logo, which was later simplified in 2014 by dropping the gradient and updating the typeface.

Facilities

AC Transit operates out of six major sites in Alameda and Contra Costa counties: four operating divisions to handle light maintenance, refueling, and bus storage; a central maintenance facility for major overhauls, procurement, and parts storage; and an administrative headquarters.

General Office
AC Transit administration started in the Alameda County Courthouse, and later moved to temporary quarters in the Claremont Hotel in September 1957 before moving back to downtown Oakland at the Plaza Building at 506 15th Street in January 1959. With the purchase of Key System assets, AC Transit moved its General Offices (GO) into the Key System Building at 1106 Broadway in October 1960. The GO moved again to the Latham Square Building at 508 16th Street in April 1963, where it would stay for nearly 25 years. In late 1983, the District released a request for bids to build a new GO at 1600 Franklin, a site then occupied by a parking lot which had been purchased by AC Transit. Groundbreaking on the new site began in April 1985, and the first occupants moved into the 10-story building in June 1987. The building was built by private developers on public land, and a lease-to-own scheme meant the public would eventually own it as well.

Central Maintenance Facility
The Central Maintenance Facility (CMF) is close to Seminary Division; the site was originally built as a warehouse for the adjacent Durant Motors Star factory and was later used as a General Motors parts facility until it was purchased by AC Transit in 1980. Prior to the opening of CMF, major maintenance was performed at Emeryville Division.

Operating divisions
The operating divisions are located in Emeryville (Division 2), Richmond (D3), East Oakland (also known as Seminary, D4), and Hayward (D6); an annex adjacent to Seminary is known as 66th Avenue or D4 Annex. The Emeryville (D2), Richmond (D3), and East Oakland (D4) sites were acquired with the purchase of Key System assets in 1960.

D6 originally opened in Newark to serve southern Alameda County routes in November 1975. In 1981, AC Transit exercised an option to purchase a  site in Hayward from Mack Trucks to relieve overcrowding at the four operating divisions. D6 moved from Newark to Hayward in October 1986; the training center at Hayward had opened in 1985.

Richmond (D3) was closed in 2011 due to a serious fiscal crisis, and operations were moved to Emeryville. In 2014, the economy had recovered and reopening Richmond was studied. Although closing D3 had the intended effect of reducing labor costs, the three remaining divisions were operating at or near capacity and service was suffering, as buses for northern routes had to be brought in from Emeryville. Reopening Richmond would also increase operational flexibility, and AC Transit invested more than $15 million in improvements before reopening D3 in 2017.

In a 2018 study, AC Transit planners noted the four operating divisions were above their maximum bus capacity and presented a plan to remodel and expand three of the four operating divisions. Under the plan, Seminary (D4) would expand into a two-deck facility, taking advantage of an adjacent property owned by AC Transit on 66th Avenue and a potential purchase of a city-owned site to expand the total site area from  capable of holding 400 to 500 buses. A second division, known as Division 5, would be co-located at the expanded site. In addition, the plan called for the relocation of the Central Maintenance Facility from D4 to D6 (Hayward), the Training and Education Center (TEC) would be relocated from D6 to D2 (Emeryville), and D2 itself would be moved to a new  site close to the MacArthur Maze at the corner of Burma St and Maritime Ave.

See also
Neighboring agencies:
 San Francisco Municipal Railway fleet
 SamTrans fleet
 Santa Clara Valley Transportation Authority fleet

References

External links
 
 
 
 

Public transportation in San Francisco
Public transportation in San Mateo County, California
Public transportation in Santa Clara County, California
Public transportation in Alameda County, California
Public transportation in Contra Costa County, California
Transportation in Oakland, California
Bus transportation in California